Pitt ministry can refer to several ministries of Great Britain and later the United Kingdom:

 Pitt–Devonshire ministry, the British government dominated by William Pitt the Elder from 1756 to 1757
 Pitt–Newcastle ministry, the British government dominated by William Pitt the Elder from 1757 to 1761
 Chatham ministry, the British government led by William Pitt the Elder as Lord Chatham from 1766 to 1768
 First Pitt ministry, the British government led by William Pitt the Younger from 1783 to 1801
 Second Pitt ministry, the British government led by William Pitt the Younger from 1804 to 1806

See also
 Premiership of William Pitt (disambiguation)